Kirsty Maree Lamb (born 27 June 1994) is an Australian rules footballer playing for the  in the AFL Women's (AFLW) competition. Lamb previously played cricket for Victoria in the Women's National Cricket League (WNCL) and for the Melbourne Renegades in the Women's Big Bash League (WBBL).

Cricket
An all-rounder bowling left-arm medium pace and batting right-handed, Lamb was appointed captain of Victorian Premier Cricket club Plenty Valley at age 19. She began playing for Victoria in 2012–13, appearing in six Women's National Cricket League (WNCL) matches that season and winning the team's Rookie of the Year Award. Lamb signed with the Melbourne Renegades for the inaugural Women's Big Bash League season, playing a total of eight matches.

Despite not having played for Victoria and the Renegades since the 2015–16 season, Lamb has remained involved in the administrative side of the sport through her position as an events coordinator at the Australian Cricketers' Association.

Australian rules football

VWFL/VFLW 
After moving from Yarrambat Junior Football Club in 2009, Lamb played over 150 games for Diamond Creek Women's Football Club. In 2012, she was a major contributor to Diamond Creek's maiden Victorian Women's Football League (VWFL) premiership, winning the Lisa Hardeman Medal (awarded to the player adjudged best afield) in a five-point Grand Final defeat of Darebin at Box Hill City Oval.

Lamb went on to appear in the 2014 VWFL Grand Final with Diamond Creek at Coburg City Oval, kicking two goals in a 30-point loss to Darebin. In the VFL Women's (VFLW) competition, the successor league to the VWFL, Lamb and Diamond Creek reached the 2017 Grand Final at Docklands Stadium, though her team would again suffer defeat at the hands of Darebin.

AFLW 

Lamb was drafted by the Western Bulldogs with their 18th selection and 138th overall in the 2016 AFL Women's draft. She made her debut in the 32-point win against  at VU Whitten Oval in the opening round of the 2017 season. Following the match, she accepted a one-game suspension by pleading guilty to engaging in rough conduct against Akec Makur Chuot. 

In 2018, Lamb was an integral member of the Western Bulldogs' premiership team, playing every game of the season and finishing third in the club's best and fairest count. She collected 12 disposals and laid eight tackles in the six-point Grand Final victory against  at Ikon Park.

Lamb had a strong 2021 season, finishing as runner-up in the Western Bulldogs' best and fairest count. In a six-point round two victory against  at VU Whitten Oval, she recorded 16 disposals, eight tackles and a career-first vote in the league's best and fairest count. On 16 June 2021, it was revealed that Lamb had signed a contract extension with the club after playing every game possible for the club that season.

2022 proved to be a breakout season for Lamb, with the "tough midfielder" earning selection in the All-Australian team and winning the AFLPA Most Courageous Player award. She also tied for first place with Ellie Blackburn in the Western Bulldogs' best and fairest count, finished fifth in the AFL Coaches' Champion Player award, and ended the league's best and fairest count in equal-13th position with nine votes.

Statistics
Statistics are correct to the end of the 2022 season.

|- style=background:#EAEAEA
| scope=row | 2017 ||  || 27
| 6 || 4 || 0 || 47 || 15 || 62 || 6 || 20 || 0.7 || 0.0 || 7.8 || 2.5 || 10.3 || 1.0 || 3.3 || 0
|-
| scope=row bgcolor=F0E68C | 2018# ||  || 27
| 8 || 0 || 2 || 75 || 27 || 102 || 16 || 43 || 0.0 || 0.3 || 9.4 || 3.4 || 12.8 || 2.0 || 5.4 || 0
|- style=background:#EAEAEA
| scope=row | 2019 ||  || 27
| 7 || 0 || 2 || 73 || 25 || 98 || 24 || 43 || 0.0 || 0.3 || 10.4 || 3.6 || 14.0 || 3.4 || 6.1 || 0
|-
| scope=row | 2020 ||  || 27
| 6 || 3 || 3 || 56 || 26 || 82 || 19 || 26 || 0.5 || 0.5 || 9.3 || 4.3 || 13.6 || 3.2 || 4.3 || 0
|- style=background:#EAEAEA
| scope=row | 2021 ||  || 27
| 9 || 2 || 3 || 103 || 59 || 162 || 37 || 54 || 0.2 || 0.3 || 11.4 || 6.6 || 18.0 || 4.1 || 6.0 || 5
|-
| scope=row | 2022 ||  || 27
| 10 || 6 || 3 || 119 || 68 || 187 || 27 || 34 || 0.6 || 0.3 || 11.9 || 6.8 || 18.7 || 2.7 || 3.4 || 9
|- class=sortbottom
! colspan=3 | Career
! 46 !! 15 !! 13 !! 473 !! 220 !! 693 !! 129 !! 220 !! 0.3 !! 0.3 !! 10.3 !! 4.8 !! 15.1 !! 2.8 !! 4.8 !! 14
|}

References

External links 

Kirsty Lamb's profile at Cricket Australia

1994 births
Living people
Western Bulldogs (AFLW) players
Australian rules footballers from Victoria (Australia)
Melbourne Renegades (WBBL) cricketers
Victorian Women's Football League players
Australian women cricketers
Cricketers from Victoria (Australia)
Staffordshire women cricketers
Australian expatriate cricketers in the United Kingdom
Australian expatriate sportspeople in England